Thomas Blanchard may refer to:

 Thomas Blanchard (academic), early principal of Brasenose College, Oxford
 Thomas Blanchard (inventor) (1788–1864), American inventor
 Thomas Blanchard Stowell (1846–1927), American educator
 Thomas Blanchard (actor) (born 1980), French actor